The 1956 Utah gubernatorial election was held on November 6, 1956. Republican nominee George Dewey Clyde defeated Democratic nominee L.C. "Rennie" Romney with 38.20% of the vote.

Primary elections
Primary elections were held on September 11, 1956.

Democratic primary

Candidates 
L.C. "Rennie" Romney, Salt Lake City Commissioner 
John S. Boyden

Results

Republican primary

Candidates
George Dewey Clyde, Director of the Utah Water and Power Board
J. Bracken Lee, incumbent Governor

Results

General election

Candidates
Major party candidates
George Dewey Clyde, Republican 
L.C. "Rennie" Romney, Democratic

Other candidates
J. Bracken Lee, Independent

Results

References

1956
Utah
Gubernatorial